Mandaturtukhutsesi was the Chief overseer of the court, in charge of the palace guard and matters of protocol. The "Mandaturtukhutsesi" was aided by an "Amirejibi" and a "Mandatur" and as a symbol of his office, he carried an "Arghani" (sceptre) presented by the monarch.

See also 
Court officials of the Kingdom of Georgia

References 

Noble titles of Georgia (country)
Georgian words and phrases